Seven words may refer to:

 Seven Words (album), a 2022 album by British band Xentrix
 "7 Words", a song by alternative metal band Deftones from their 1995 album Adrenaline
 The seven sayings of Jesus on the cross
 Musical settings of sayings of Jesus on the cross
 The seven dirty words listed by the comedian George Carlin
 Jakarta Charter, also known as the "Seven Words"